Cortaderia selloana is a species of flowering plant in the Poaceae family. It is referred to by the common name pampas grass, and is native to southern South America, including the Pampas region after which it is named.

Etymology
Cortaderia is derived from the Argentine Spanish name ‘cortadera’, meaning ‘cutter’, in reference to its razor sharp leaf margins.

Selloana is named for Friedrich Sellow (1789-1831), a German botanist and naturalist from Potsdam who worked as a plant collector in Brazil. He studied the flora of South America, especially that of Brazil. The specific epithet selloana was given by Josef August and Julius Hermann Schultes in 1827.

Cultivars

Several cultivars are available, of which the following have gained the Royal Horticultural Society's Award of Garden Merit:-.
Aureolineata 
Evita 
Monstrosa 
Patagonia 
Pumila 
Silver Feather Notcort  

Negative impact
Cortaderia has become invasive in mild-winter areas of North America. It has also been banned in Hawaii and New Zealand because of its ability to outgrow and displace native plants. In Europe, it was first introduced in the United Kingdom, later spreading to other countries in the continent like Ireland, Portugal, Spain, France, and Italy.

Pampas grass is fast-growing and can form large masses along the roads, cliffs, riverbanks, and open areas that have been disturbed by human activities or natural disturbances. Pampas grass can displace native plants and destroy their habitats, reducing biodiversity. The blade-like leaves may cause physical harm to the birds who feed off of it. 

The plant also competes with other native plants by monopolizing resources like shade, sunlight, and ground nutrients. Because of the large surface area, the leaves pose a significant fire hazard if placed near flammable substances.

Control methods
Pampas grass can be controlled through herbicide treatment. To accomplish this, the grass is cut down near the base. Next, a 2% glyphosate chemical solution is combined with a silicone-based surfactant and applied to enhance the penetration potential. This method works best in the fall because there is overall better control compared to other seasons. Another control method is to cut and bag inflorescences to prevent seeds from spreading or pulling seedlings.

Soil disturbance that creates bare ground can promote invasion, so it is essential to minimize disturbance or provide competition to seedlings. In order to control disturbance, applying mulch to exposed bare ground to smother seeds and prevent germination can be done. Also, planting or seeding desirable, non-invasive plants can provide competition to reduce germination and seedling establishment.

Culture
Author Li Hengrui, whose work Kite Capriccio describes life as a child in 1950s Fengtai County, Anhui mentions the use of the long stem of the Puwei (Chinese for Cortaderia selloana) in the construction of kites.

Several media outlets reported that it was planted by some couples who practise swinging in the United Kingdom as a way to indicate to other swingers that they enjoy that lifestyle. 

The reports caused a plunge in already declining sales, but the odd association has been dismissed by enthusiasts and gardening experts as "silly".

Gallery

References

External links

Pampas grass    
Cortaderia selloana
Blueplanetbiomes.org
Pampas Grass under the microscope
Pampas Grass

Danthonioideae
Bunchgrasses of South America
Grasses of Argentina
Flora of southern South America
Flora of Argentina
Garden plants of South America
Drought-tolerant plants
Flora naturalised in Australia
Invasive species in Europe
Taxa named by Josef August Schultes
Taxa named by Julius Hermann Schultes
Taxa named by Paul Friedrich August Ascherson
Taxa named by Paul Graebner